Edward Dillon  may refer to:

Edward Dillon (actor) (1879–1933), American actor and brother of John T. Dillon
Edward Dillon (American football) (c. 1885–1935), American football player and judge
Edward Dillon (bishop) (1739–1809), Irish Roman Catholic Archbishop of Tuam
Ted Dillon (1881–1941), English cricketer and rugby player